Sandanski Stadium is a multi-purpose stadium in Sandanski, Bulgaria.  It is currently used mostly for football matches and is the home ground of Vihren Sandanski.  The stadium holds 6,000.

Sandanski stadium hosted top flight matches of Vihren, when the club played in the top level of Bulgarian football. 

Football venues in Bulgaria
Sandanski
Multi-purpose stadiums in Bulgaria
Buildings and structures in Blagoevgrad Province